Regina was a territorial electoral district for the Legislative Assembly of Northwest Territories, Canada.

The riding was created by royal proclamation in 1883 and abolished in 1888. The North-West Representation Act 1888 split the riding into South Regina and North Regina.

Members of the Legislative Assembly (MLAs)

Election results

1883 election

1885 election

References

External links 
Website of the Legislative Assembly of Northwest Territories

Former electoral districts of Northwest Territories